In mathematics the Function Field Sieve is one of the most efficient algorithms to solve the Discrete Logarithm Problem (DLP) in a finite field. It has heuristic subexponential complexity. Leonard Adleman developed it in 1994  and then elaborated it together with M. D. Huang in 1999.
Previous work includes the work of D. Coppersmith  about the DLP in fields of characteristic two.

The function  for a fixed  is a one-way function used in cryptography. Several cryptographic methods are based on the DLP such as the Diffie-Hellman key exchange, the El Gamal cryptosystem and the Digital Signature Algorithm.

Number theoretical background

Function Fields 

Let  be a polynomial defining an algebraic curve over a finite field . This is a special case of an algebraic function field. It is defined over the finite field  and has transcendence degree one.

There exist bijections between valuation rings in function fields and equivalence classes of places, as well as between valuation rings and equivalence classes of valuations. This correspondence is frequently used in the Function Field Sieve algorithm.

Divisors 
A discrete valuation of the function field , namely a discrete valuation ring , has a unique maximal ideal  called a prime of the function field.

A divisor is a -linear combination over all primes, so  where  and only finitely many elements of the sum are non-zero.

Method 

Functions that decompose into irreducible function of degree smaller than some bound  are called -smooth. This is analogous to the definition of a smooth number and such functions are useful because their decomposition can be found relatively fast. The set of those functions  is called the factor base.

The sieving step of the algorithm consists of finding doubly-smooth pairs of functions. In the subsequent step we use them to find linear relations including the logarithms of the functions in the decompositions. By solving a linear system we then calculate the logarithms.
In the reduction step we express  as a combination of the logarithm we found before and thus solve the DLP.

Precomputation

Parameter selection 
The algorithm requires the following parameters: an irreducible function  of degree , a function  and a curve  of given degree  such that . Here  is the power in the order of the base field .

One also needs to set a smoothness bound  for the factor base .

Sieving 
In this step doubly-smooth pairs of functions  are found.

One considers functions of the form , then divides  by any  as many times as possible. Any  that is reduced to one in this process is -smooth.  To implement this, Gray code can be used to efficiently step through multiples of a given polynomial.

This is completely analogous to the sieving step in other sieving algorithms such as the Number Field Sieve or the index calculus algorithm. Instead of numbers one sieves through functions in  but those functions can be factored into irreducible polynomials just as numbers can be factored into primes.

Finding linear relations 
This is the most difficult part of the algorithm, involving function fields, places
and divisors as defined above. The goal is to use the doubly-smooth pairs of functions to find linear relations involving the discrete logarithms of elements in the factor base.

For each irreducible function in the factor base we find places  of  that lie over them and surrogate functions  that correspond to the places. The function defined this way is unique up to a constant in 
.

Using this and the fact that  we get the following expression: 

Then, using the fact that the divisor of a surrogate function is unique up to a constant, one gets

We now use the fact that  and the known decomposition of this expression into irreducible polynomials. Then

Here we can take the discrete logarithm of the equation up to a unit. This is called the restricted discrete logarithm . It is defined by the equation  for some unit .

where  is the inverse of  modulo .

The expressions  and the logarithms  are unknown. Once enough equations of this form are found, a linear system can be solved to find  for all .
Eventually for each  the unit corresponding to the restricted discrete logarithm can be calculated which then gives .

Reduction step 
First  mod   are computed for a random . Each of these polynomials  can be reduced to polynomials of smaller degree using a generalization of the Coppersmith method. We can reduce the degree until we get a product of -smooth polynomials. Then, taking the logarithm to the base , we can eventually compute
, which solves the DLP.

Complexity 
The Function Field Sieve runs in subexponential time in
 
using the L-notation. There is no rigorous proof of this complexity since it relies on some heuristic assumptions. For example in the sieving step we assume that numbers of the form  behave like random numbers in a given range.

Comparison with other methods 
There are two other well known algorithms that solve the discrete logarithm problem in sub-exponential time: the index calculus algorithm and a version of the Number Field Sieve.

However, it is faster than the Function Field Sieve when . It is not surprising that there exist two similar algorithms, one with number fields and the other one with function fields. In fact there is an extensive analogy between these two kinds of global fields.

The index calculus algorithm is much easier to state than the Function Field Sieve and the Number Field Sieve since it does not involve any advanced algebraic structures. The main reason why the Number Field Sieve and the Function Field Sieve are faster is that these algorithms can run with a smaller smoothness bound , so most of the computations can be done with smaller numbers.

See also 
 Algebraic function field
 Number field sieve
 Index calculus algorithm

References

Field (mathematics)